The Zhangzhou Nuclear Power Plant is a nuclear power station under construction in Lieyu Town, Yunxiao County, Zhangzhou on the coast of Fujian Province, in southeast China. 
The plant is owned by CNNC Guodian Zhangzhou Energy Co. Ltd., established in November 2011, which is owned by China National Nuclear Corporation (51%) and China Guodian Corporation (49%).
CNNC originally planned to have AP1000 light water reactors, but later changed plans to the Hualong One design.

China's Ministry of Ecology and Environment issued construction licenses for Zhangzhou units 1 and 2 on 9 October 2019, and first concrete for Unit 1 was poured one week later, on 16 October.

China's State Council approved the construction of two Hualong One units as Phase II on 14 September 2022.

Reactor data
The Zhangzhou Nuclear Power Plant consists of 4 planned reactors.

See also

Nuclear power in China

References

External links

Nuclear power stations in China
Buildings and structures under construction in China
Nuclear power stations with proposed reactors